Harald "Slaktarn" Andersson (2 April 1907 – 18 May 1985) was a Swedish discus thrower. In 1934 he won a European title and held the world record for eight months. The same year he was awarded the Svenska Dagbladet Gold Medal.

Career

Andersson was Swedish champion in every year from 1932 to 1935 and the world's best discus thrower in 1934 and 1935. He broke Paul Jessup's world record of 51.73 m twice in one competition (a dual meet between the Swedish and Norwegian teams in Oslo) on 25 August 1934, throwing first 52.20 m and then 52.42 m; the latter mark was officially ratified by the IAAF. At the European Championships in Turin two weeks later Andersson threw 50.38 m and won by more than three meters from Paul Winter and István Donogán.

Andersson lost his world record in April 1935, when Germany's Willy Schröder threw 53.10 m in Magdeburg; however, he remained the world's top thrower, as Schröder was less consistent at a high level and suffered from health problems over the summer. Andersson won both the Swedish and AAA Championships titles that year, and on 13 October he improved his Swedish record to 53.02 m in Örebro. He was a leading favorite for the 1936 Summer Olympics in Berlin, but injured himself before the Games; he attempted to throw in the qualification, but only managed about 38.5 metres and failed to qualify for the final.

References

1907 births
1985 deaths
Swedish male discus throwers
Olympic athletes of Sweden
Athletes (track and field) at the 1936 Summer Olympics
European Athletics Championships medalists
World record setters in athletics (track and field)